Darani (also Romanized as Dārānī; also known as Dānvarā, Dārānā, and Tārānī) is a village in Dizmar-e Sharqi Rural District, Minjavan District, Khoda Afarin County, East Azerbaijan Province, Iran. At the 2006 census, its population was 295, in 66 families.

References 

Populated places in Khoda Afarin County